is a former Japanese football player. On 1 January 2016, Kento retired from professional football aged 26.

Playing career
Kento Onodera played for Zweigen Kanazawa and Honda from 2014 to 2015.

References

External links

1991 births
Living people
Tokoha University alumni
Association football people from Shizuoka Prefecture
Japanese footballers
J3 League players
Japan Football League players
Zweigen Kanazawa players
Honda FC players
Association football midfielders